The Collón Curá Formation is a Middle Miocene fossiliferous geological formation of the southern Neuquén Basin in northwestern Patagonia and the western Cañadón Asfalto Basin of central Patagonia, Argentina. The formation crops out from the southern Neuquén Province, the western Río Negro Province to the northern Chubut Province.

The formation dates from the Langhian to earliest Tortonian epochs of the Middle to Late Miocene, typically Colloncuran.

The Collón Curá Formation is named after Estancia Collón Curá (1 on the map in the infobox) along the Collón Curá River (2), a tributary of the Limay River in the Río Negro watershed, and lends its name to the Colloncuran, one of the South American land mammal ages. The formation has provided many fossils of mammals, reptiles, among others the snake Waincophis australis, and the largest terror bird Kelenken guillermoi. The rodent Galileomys colloncurensis and the typothere Protypotherium colloncurensis were named after the formation.

Description 
In 1929, Groeber named the unit Colloncurense, separating the sediments from the older Santa Cruz Formation, that Roth had grouped in the same unit. Yrigoyen in 1969 formally defined the stratigraphic unit as Collón Curá Formation. The type section of the formation is on both sides on the Collón Curá River.

In the Chapelcó Range of the Neuquén Basin, the formation is unconformably overlain by the Caleufú Formation, while basaltic lava flows of the El Mirador Formation, and Quaternary alluvium overly the Collón Curá Formation in the Cañadón Asfalto Basin. In the Collón Curá valley, the formation covers Paleogene sediments of the Huitrera and Cerro Petiso Formations and in places overlying crystalline basement. In other parts of the Neuquén Basin, the formation overlies the Early Miocene Cerro Bandera Formation or the Late Cretaceous Angostura Colorada Formation. In the Cañadón Asfalto Basin, the Collón Curá Formation overlies the Ñirihuau Formation, and in the area around the Chico River in the same basin, the formation overlies the La Pava Formation. In this location, the Collón Curá Formation is unconformably overlain by the Río Negro Formation.

The oldest age for the formation has been given as 16.1 Ma, and the top of the formation has been dated to 11 ± 1, and more precisely to 10.7 Ma. 40Ar/39Ar analysis on amphibole crystals, collected from fresh pumice clasts, revealed an age of 14.86 ± 0.13 Ma for the middle section of the Collón Curá Formation in the Gastre Sub-basin of the Cañadón Asfalto Basin. Earlier estimates based on K/Ar dating on biotite minerals of the Pilcaniyeú Ignimbrite Member were given as 15 Ma (1980) and 14.1 Ma (1990). Overall, the age of the formation ranges from Langhian to earliest Tortonian.

Lithologies 
In its type locality, the Collón Curá Formation is characterized by homogeneous greyish-yellow well-consolidated massive vitrocrystalline tuffs without visible sedimentary structures, but with calcareous concretions. The volcanic crystals in the tuff comprise andesine, hornblende and hypersthene in an argillaceous matrix.

Depositional environment 

The formation was deposited in a fluvial and lacustrine environment dominated by pyroclastic flows in small basins, separated by faults. The sub-Andean region of Argentina went through a phase of marine transgression during the Middle Miocene, approximately 15 to 13 Ma. The Collón Curá Formation shows growth strata in the Cañadón Asfalto Basin, indicating syn-tectonic deposition. In this basin, the formation ranges from a shallow lacustrine setting in the basal section, a deep lacustrine system with deltaic facies in the middle and upper parts. The Collón Curá Formation is correlated with the contemporaneous fluvial and lacustrine tuffaceous Chichinales Formation of the central Neuquén Basin.

The Collón Curá Formation, together with the underlying Ñirihuau Formation in the Cañadón Asfalto Basin, was deposited in a fragmented, possibly by pull-apart tectonic activity, foreland basin setting.

The climate in the early middle Miocene was hot, a period known as the Middle Miocene Climatic Optimum. This thermal maximum was followed by a period of cooling, the Middle Miocene disruption, probably related to glacial growth and the reestablishment of the ice of the East Antarctic Ice Sheet. Atmospheric concentrations of CO2 are estimated to have dropped from about 300 to 140 ppm.

Paleontological significance 

The mammal fauna of the Collón Curá Formation led researchers to establish the Colloncuran age in the SALMA classification, ranging from 15.5 to 13.8 Ma. This age, used in South America as subdivision for the Cenozoic, follows on the Friasian age, defined from the Chilean Río Frías Formation of the Aysén Basin and precedes the Laventan age, named after the Konzentrat-Lagerstätte La Venta pertaining to the Honda Group of the Upper Magdalena Valley of central Colombia.

The rodent Galileomys colloncurensis, and the typothere Protypotherium colloncurensis were named after the formation.

The fossil mammal assemblage of the Collón Curá Formation represents a fauna preceding the evolution of the Caviidae. The oldest true caviid, Prodolichotis pridiana is known from the Villavieja and La Victoria Formations of La Venta, Colombia. Sister taxa of these caviids first appeared in the Colloncuran; Guiomys unica and Microcardiodon williensis, found in the Collón Curá Formation. In alternative classification proposed in 2012 by Pérez and Pol, Guiomys is considered an optional early caviid, pushing back the lineage to the Colloncuran.

Fossil content

Typotheria

Primates

Rodents

Sparassodonta

Litopterna

Cingulata

Pilosa

Paucituberculata

Birds

Reptiles

See also 

 South American land mammal ages
 Cucaracha Formation of the Canal Zone, Panama
 Castilletes Formation of the Cocinetas Basin in northern Colombia
 Viche Formation of northern Ecuador
 Pebas Formation of the Amazon Basin
 Pisco Formation of the Pisco Basin in southern Peru
 Cura-Mallín Group of the western Neuquén Basin

References

Bibliography 
Geologic map
 

Geology
 
 
 
 
 
 
 
 

Paleontology
 
 
 
 
 
 
 
 
 
 
 
 
 
 
 
 
 
 
 

Geologic formations of Argentina
 
Langhian
Serravallian
Tortonian
Miocene Series of South America
Neogene Argentina
Tuff formations
Sandstone formations
Fluvial deposits
Lacustrine deposits
Deltaic deposits
Fossiliferous stratigraphic units of South America
Paleontology in Argentina
Formations
Formations
Geology of Chubut Province
Geology of Neuquén Province
Geology of Río Negro Province
Geology of Patagonia
Mapuche language